The Dix River is a  tributary of the Kentucky River in central Kentucky in the United States.

It flows generally northwest, in a tight meandering course, passing north of Stanford and east of Danville. Northeast of Danville it is impounded by the Dix Dam to form the Herrington Lake reservoir.

At Danville the river has a mean annual discharge of 480 cubic feet per second.

The watershed of the river is largely agricultural land, with undulating hills over a bed of limestone.  The river is a popular destination for fly fishing, in particular for varieties of bass.  Occasionally, recreational kayakers and canoeists can be found on same-day trips.  Water levels are Class I+ with possible mild class II.

See also
Cedar Creek (Dix River tributary)
List of rivers of Kentucky

References

External links
University of Kentucky: lower Dix River watershed
University of Kentucky: upper Dix River watershed

Rivers of Kentucky
Rivers of Rockcastle County, Kentucky
Rivers of Lincoln County, Kentucky
Rivers of Boyle County, Kentucky
Rivers of Garrard County, Kentucky